Mohamad Noor bin Dawoo is a Malaysian politician. He was the Member of Perak State Legislative Assembly for Selinsing from 2018 to 2022.

Education 
He went to SK Seri Pinang, SMK Muzaffar Shah, SMK Doktor Burhannuddin and Lembah Pantai College. He is also a Bachelor in Humanities Studies of USM.

Election result

References

External links 
 

Malaysian Muslims
United Malays National Organisation politicians
Members of the Perak State Legislative Assembly
Malaysian people of Malay descent
Living people
Year of birth missing (living people)